Gilbert Price Lloyd Turner (8 May 1888 – 1968) was a bishop in the Anglican church.

Biography 

The son of Major G. H. Turner, he was educated at the Collegiate School for Boys in Victoria, British Columbia and at St Augustine's College, Canterbury. In 1912, he was ordained as a priest. He was a curate at St. Paul's Church, Cape Town from 1920 to 1922, and again from 1925 to 1927, then rector. In 1939, he was appointed Bishop of St. Helena. In 1959 he was admitted as an Officer of the Most Excellent Order of the British Empire.

Notes and references 

 The Times 6 November 1968

External links 

 

1888 births
1968 deaths
Anglican bishops of St Helena
Alumni of St Augustine's College, Canterbury